Sir Thomas Frazer Grove, 1st Baronet  (27 November 1823 – 14 January 1897) was an English Liberal politician who sat in the House of Commons between 1868 and 1892.

Grove was the son of John Grove of Ferne House, near Salisbury and his wife Jean Frazer, daughter of Sir William Frazer, 3rd Baronet. Educated at Sherborne, he was captain in the 6th Dragoons and a deputy lieutenant and J.P. for Wiltshire. He was High Sheriff of Wiltshire in 1863 and a Hon. Lieutenant-Colonel of the Wiltshire Yeomanry Cavalry.

Grove was elected at the 1865 general election as Member of Parliament (MP) for South Wiltshire, and was re-elected in 1868. After his defeat at the 1874 general election he did not stand again until after the 1885 redistribution of seats. He was made a baronet on 18 March 1874, of Ferne House, in the parish of Donhead St Andrew, in the County of Wiltshire,

At the 1885 general election Grove was elected MP for Wilton. When the Liberal Party split in 1886 over Irish Home Rule, he joined the breakaway Liberal Unionist Party which opposed Home Rule. He was re-elected unopposed at the 1886 general election, but at the 1892 general election he lost his seat to the Conservative Party candidate, Viscount Folkestone.

Grove was elected unopposed to Wiltshire County Council in 1889.

Grove died at the age of 73. He was succeeded in the baronetcy by his son Walter.

Grove married Katherine Grace O'Grady, daughter of the Hon. Waller O'Grady, Q.C, on 16 January 1847. After her death on 8 June 1879, he married Frances Hinton Barnewall, daughter of Henry Northcote and widow of the Hon. Frederick Barnewall.

References

External links 
 

1823 births
1897 deaths
People educated at Sherborne School
Liberal Party (UK) MPs for English constituencies
Liberal Unionist Party MPs for English constituencies
Members of Wiltshire County Council
Grove, Sir Thomas, 1st baronet
UK MPs 1865–1868
UK MPs 1868–1874
UK MPs 1885–1886
UK MPs 1886–1892
Deputy Lieutenants of Wiltshire
High Sheriffs of Wiltshire
English justices of the peace